Taleqan-ye Yek (meaning "Taleqan 1", also Romanized as Ţāleqān-ye Yek and Ţāleghānī-ye Yek) is a village in Kashkan Rural District, Shahivand District, Dowreh County, Lorestan Province, Iran. At the 2006 census, its population was 229, in 46 families.

References 

Towns and villages in Dowreh County